The Space Technology and Applications Mastery, Innovation and Advancement (abbreviated and stylized as STAMINA4Space) is a space technology program by the Philippine government. It is considered as the successor program to the Philippine Scientific Earth Observation Microsatellite (PHL-Microsat) program, a cooperation between the Philippine government and Japanese universities to develop microsatellites. The program is funded under the Department of Science and Technology.

It aims to use the results from the PHL-Microsat program to further research and develop small satellite technology capability in the country.

STAMINA4Space Program officially succeeded the PHL-Microsat program in August 2018, inheriting two satellites, Diwata-1 and Diwata-2 and the CubeSat Maya-1.

Sub-projects
The project is divided into five sub-projects.

STEP-UP Project
One of the four components of the STAMINA4Space Program is the Space Science and Technology Proliferation through University Partnerships (STEP-UP) Project. Under the program engineering students from the University of the Philippines who seeks to pursue a nanosatellite engineering track will learn how to build nanosatellites within the university's Diliman campus and have a cube satellite designed by themselves tested for space environment at the Kyushu Institute of Technology in Japan. The satellites will then be launched to the International Space Station for deployment and students will be trained on operating the satellites.

A University Consortium on Space Science and Technology Applications is planned to be established within the STEP-UP Project and focus will be shifted to providing nanosatellite engineering scholarships and setting ground stations in within other universities in the country.

Mission summary

References

Space program of the Philippines
Department of Science and Technology (Philippines)